Centro Médico Excel, or Excel Medical Center, is a skyscraper in Tijuana, Mexico. One of the most prominent buildings in the city, it is the 11th tallest building in Tijuana.

It is located within the central business district of Tijuana, the Zona Rio.

History
Excel Medical Center’s founder is a  cardiovascular and thoracic surgeon from California, Dr. Jose Hernandez Fujigaki. Excel Hospital performed the first open heart surgery program in Baja California Mexico. Today, Excel Hospital is the largest, multi specialty private hospital in Tijuana Mexico.

Recent additions have turned it into a 22-story hospital and one of the largest medical centers in Tijuana.  Excel hospital continues to grow and is currently under construction adding 34 stories for parking, doctors offices and more ancillary services for the medical community.

Use
It serves primarily as hospital, thus its name in Spanish, translated as Excel Medical Center. In addition to hospital space, the building maintains space for offices housing the hospital's management areas.

Excel Medical Center specializes in comprehensive medical procedures such as:

 Mammography & Radiology
 Cardiac Catheterization Laboratory
 Cardiac Stress Testing
 Non-invasive Cardiology
 9 Operating Rooms
 15 Intensive Care Suites (U.S. Standards)
 Telemetry Monitoring
 Heart Surgery
 Pulmonary Surgery
 Obstetrics and Gynecology
 Prostate Surgery
 Hip and Knee Replacement
 Gastric Bypass Surgery
 Spine Surgery
 Pediatric Orthopaedics
 Oncology Surgery and Treatment
 Cosmetic Surgery
 Breast Augmentation or Reduction
 Dentistry, Implants
 Traumatology and Orthopaedics
 Physical Rehabilitation
 Pulmonary Therapy
 MRI and Tomography
 Emergency Care
 Intensive Care

See also
List of tallest buildings in Tijuana

References

External links
 Centro Médico Excel

Skyscrapers in Tijuana